Feng Zhongpu (born 26 July 1928), better known by her pen name Zong Pu, is a Chinese novelist. She won the Mao Dun Literature Prize for her 2001 novel, Note of Hiding in the East.

Born in Beijing, Zong is the daughter of Feng Youlan, a prominent philosopher, and she grew up on various university campuses. Zong graduated from Tsinghua University in 1951. She became a member of the China Writers Association in 1962.

Works
 Hong dou (Red Beans), 1957
 Xian shang de meng (Dream on the Strings), 1978
 'Sanheng shi' (Everlasting Rock), 1980. Translated by Aimee Lykes as The Everlasting Rock, 1998. .
 shu shui (Who am I), 1979
 (A Head in the Marshes), 1985
 Nan du ji (Heading South), 1988
 Dong cang ji (Hiding in the East), 2001

Translated works (English) 

 Departure for the South
 Eastern Concealment

References

Seven Contemporary Chinese Women Writers by  Irene Wettenhall The Australian Journal of Chinese Affairs, No. 10 (Jul., 1983), pp. 175–178]
Research Note: Women Writers by Gladys Yang in China Quarterly, No. 103 (Sep., 1985), pp. 510–517.
The river fans out: Chinese fiction since the late 1970s by Henry Y. H.  Zhao, European Review (2003), 11: 193-208 Cambridge University Press.

1928 births
Living people
20th-century Chinese short story writers
20th-century Chinese women writers
21st-century Chinese short story writers
21st-century Chinese women writers
Chinese children's writers
Chinese women children's writers
Chinese scholars
Chinese women novelists
Chinese women short story writers
Mao Dun Literature Prize laureates
People's Republic of China short story writers
Short story writers from Beijing